Lorinna is a rural locality in the local government area (LGA) of Kentish in the North-west and west LGA region of Tasmania. The 2016 census recorded a population of 77 for the state suburb of Lorinna.

The entire community of Lorinna is independent from the Tasmanian grid, relying on its own electricity production from renewable energy sources. It is also supplied by its own organic food production, that local farms also sell at regional markets.

History 
Lorinna was gazetted as a locality in 1965. The name is believed to be an Aboriginal word meaning "waddy".

Geography
The Forth River / Lake Cethana forms the western boundary.

Road infrastructure 
Route C138 (Olivers Road) follows part of the eastern boundary. From there, Lemonthyme Road (which also follows part of the eastern boundary) and Lorinna Road provide access to the locality.

References

Towns in Tasmania
Localities of Kentish Council